Lawrence Watts (2 May 1935 – 26 August 1997) was an English cricketer. He played for Gloucestershire between 1957 and 1958.

References

External links

1935 births
1997 deaths
English cricketers
Gloucestershire cricketers
Cricketers from Bristol
Oxford University cricketers
Alumni of Wadham College, Oxford